The canton of Charolles is an administrative division of the Saône-et-Loire department, eastern France. Its borders were modified at the French canton reorganisation which came into effect in March 2015. Its seat is in Charolles.

It consists of the following communes:
 
Ballore
Baron
Beaubery
Champlecy
Changy
Charolles
Colombier-en-Brionnais
Dyo
Fontenay
Grandvaux
Lugny-lès-Charolles
Marcilly-la-Gueurce
Martigny-le-Comte
Mornay
Oudry
Ouroux-sous-le-Bois-Sainte-Marie
Ozolles
Palinges
Pouilloux
Prizy
Le Rousset-Marizy
Saint-Aubin-en-Charollais
Saint-Bonnet-de-Joux
Saint-Bonnet-de-Vieille-Vigne
Saint-Germain-en-Brionnais
Saint-Julien-de-Civry
Saint-Romain-sous-Gourdon
Saint-Vincent-Bragny
Suin
Vaudebarrier
Vendenesse-lès-Charolles
Viry

References

Cantons of Saône-et-Loire